Tomorrow's a Killer (also known as Prettykill) is a 1987 Canadian-American thriller slasher film directed by George Kaczender and starring David Birney, Susannah York and Yaphet Kotto. The plot concerns a policeman who hunts a serial killer. The film was shot in Toronto.

Premise
A policeman, haunted by his past, tries to hunt down a serial killer murdering prostitutes.

Cast

– Source:

References

External links

1987 films
1987 horror films
American slasher films
Canadian slasher films
English-language Canadian films
1980s English-language films
Films directed by George Kaczender
Films scored by Robert O. Ragland
1987 thriller films
1980s American films
1980s Canadian films
English-language horror films